Arabian Love is a 1922 American silent drama film directed by Jerome Storm and starring John Gilbert, Barbara Bedford and Barbara La Marr. It is not known whether the film currently survives. It was partly filmed on location in the Mojave Desert.

Plot
Shortly after marrying a man, Nadine Fortier travels through the desert to a distant city to visit her dying mother. On her way, she is kidnapped by a group of bandits, who use her when gambling. Nadine eventually becomes the property of Norman Stone, an American criminal who is on the run from the police. Norman helps her to safety and they plan on crossing ways. Nadine, however, contacts him to find her husband's murderer.

Themar, the daughter of a sheik, is jealous of Norman's interest in Nadine and she tells Nadine that Norman is responsible for her father's death. Upon confronting him, Norman admits that her husband had several clandestine meetings with his sister and that he was accidentally shot to death in his presence. Although she is initially mad, their love for each other proves to be more powerful. They eventually become a couple and leave the country for America.

Production and release
Arabian Love was made to profit on the success of The Sheik (1921), a film which romanticizes sheiks and Latin lovers. Most films John Gilbert made at Fox Film Corporation flopped, but Arabian Love became a great success. Gilbert was praised for his portrayal of a sheik, but the actor himself loathed it and made sure he later would not appear again in that sort of character. Barbara La Marr was praised by the critics too, with the film magazine Moving Picture World stating that "the forlorn lovesickness of the sheik’s daughter [is] unusually effective".

Cast
John Gilbert as Norman Stone
Barbara Bedford as Nadine Fortier
Barbara La Marr as Themar
Herschel Mayall as The Sheik
Bob Kortman as Ahmed Bey
William Orlamond as Dr. Lagorio

References

Bibliography
 Golden, Eve. John Gilbert: The Last of the Silent Film Stars. University Press of Kentucky, 2013.

External links

 

1922 films
American black-and-white films
1922 romantic drama films
American romantic drama films
American silent feature films
Films with screenplays by Jules Furthman
Fox Film films
Films directed by Jerome Storm
1920s American films
Silent romantic drama films
Silent American drama films